Dwight K. Ferguson (born 16 May 1970) is a former World Class Sprinter that competed on the professional level nationally, Internationally and the European Circuit pre/post major international track and field championships. (running)|sprint]] indoor and outdoor competition in 55m, 60m, 100m, 4x100m athlete from the Bahamas. He won the silver medal in the men's 100 metres at the 1998 Central American and Caribbean Games, and competed professionally for his native country at the 1996 Summer Olympics in Atlanta, Georgia, and the Senior Pan Am Games. Dwight also competed at many professional races in the United States until retirement with a career ending injury in 2006.

References
sports-reference

Bahamian male sprinters
Athletes (track and field) at the 1996 Summer Olympics
Olympic athletes of the Bahamas
1970 births
Living people
Central American and Caribbean Games silver medalists for the Bahamas
Competitors at the 1998 Central American and Caribbean Games
Central American and Caribbean Games medalists in athletics